This is a list of adventures and supplements published for the Call of Cthulhu role-playing game.

Chaosium

Adventures
Alone Against the Dark, Chaosium Inc., 1985.
Alone Against the Wendigo, Chaosium Inc., 1983.
The Asylum & Other Tales, Chaosium Inc., 1983.
At Your Door, Chaosium Inc., 1990.
Blood Brothers, Chaosium Inc., 1990.
Blood Brothers 2
The Complete Masks of Nyarlathotep
Cthulhu Casebook, Chaosium Inc., 1990.
Cthulhu Classics, Chaosium Inc., 1990.
Curse of the Chthonians, Chaosium Inc., 1984.
The Dreaming Stone
Fatal Experiments
The Fungi from Yuggoth, Chaosium Inc., 1984, 1987.
The Great Old Ones, Chaosium Inc., 1989.
Horror on the Orient Express
Horror's Heart
In the Shadows
Mansions of Madness, Chaosium Inc., 1990.
Masks of Nyarlathotep, Chaosium Inc., 1989.
Shadows of Yog-Sothoth, Chaosium Inc., 1982.
Spawn of Azathoth, Chaosium Inc., 1986.
Terror from the Stars, Chaosium Inc., 1989.
Trail of Tsathogghua, Chaosium Inc., 1984.
Unseen Masters

Supplements
1920s Investigators' Companion
Arkham Unveiled, Chaosium Inc., 1990.
The Cairo Guidebook
Call of Cthulhu Investigator Sheets
Call of Cthulhu Keeper's Screen
The Compact Arkham Unveiled
Cthulhu by Gaslight
Cthulhu Companion, Chaosium Inc., 1983.
Cthulhu Now, Chaosium Inc., 1987.
Dire Documents
Encyclopedia Cthulhiana
Fragments of Fear: The Second Cthulhu Companion, Chaosium Inc., 1985.
Green and Pleasant Land, Chaosium Inc./Games Workshop, 1987.
H.P. Lovecraft's Dreamlands, Chaosium Inc., 1988.
The London Guidebook
Miskatonic U. Graduate Kit, Chaosium Inc.,
S. Petersen's Field Guide to Creatures of the Dreamlands, Chaosium Inc., 1989.
S. Petersen's Field Guide to Cthulhu Monsters, Chaosium Inc., 1988.
Taint of Madness
Terror Australis: Call of Cthulhu in the Land Down Under, Chaosium Inc., 1987.
Ye Booke of Monstres II

Cubicle 7 Entertainment
Cthulhu Britannica
 Cthulhu Britannica: Folklore
 Avalon - The County of Somerset
Shadows over Scotland
 Cthulhu Britannica: London box set
 Cthulhu Britannica: London The Curse of Nineveh
 Cthulhu Britannica: Cards from the Smoke
 Cthulhu Britannica Thompsons Journal 
 Cthulhu Britannica Neves Journal
World War Cthulhu

Games Workshop
Nightmare in Norway, Games Workshop, 1985.
The Statue of the Sorcerer & The Vanishing Conjurer, Games Workshop, 1986.
Trail of the Loathsome Slime, Games Workshop, 1985.

Grenadier Models
The Horrible Secret of Monhegan Island, Grenadier Models, 1986.

Pagan Publishing
Coming Full Circle
The Golden Dawn
Walker in the Wastes (1994)

Triad Entertainments
 Lurking Fears
 Grimrock Island
 Whispers in the Dark
 End of the World 
 Dwellers in Shadow
 Return to Lovecraft Country

Theater of the Mind Enterprises
The Arkham Evil
Death in Dunwich
Whispers from the Abyss
Pursuit to Kadath
"Glozel est Authentique!"

References

Call of Cthulhu (role-playing game)
Call